Saint Ignatius College or St. Ignatius of Loyola College may refer to:

Australia
Saint Ignatius' College, Riverview, New South Wales
Saint Ignatius' College, Adelaide, South Australia
Saint Ignatius College, Geelong, Victoria

Bolivia
St Ignatius College, La Paz

Brazil
St. Ignatius College, Fortaleza
St. Ignatius College, Rio de Janeiro

Canada
St. Ignatius of Loyola Church (Montreal)

Chile
St. Ignatius College, Santiago

Colombia
St. Ignatius Loyola College, Medellín

East Timor
St. Ignatius of Loyola College, East Timor

Hungary
Saint Ignatius Jesuit College of Excellence, Budapest

Ireland
Coláiste Iognáid, Galway

Italy
St. Ignatius College, Messina

Malta
St Ignatius College, in Villa St Ignatius, St. Julian's (closed 1907)

New Zealand
 St Ignatius of Loyola Catholic College, Drury

Spain
St. Ignatius College, Barcelona
St. Ignatius of Loyola College, Las Palmas
St. Ignatius of Loyola College, Alcala de Henares, Madrid
St. Ignatius College, Oviedo
St. Ignatius College, Pamplona
St. Ignatius College, San Sebastian

United Kingdom
St Ignatius' College, Enfield, London, England
St. Ignatius College (Galway), Scotland

United States
St. Ignatius College, former name of the University of San Francisco, California
St. Ignatius College Preparatory, San Francisco, California
St. Ignatius College Prep, Chicago, Illinois
St. Ignatius College, former name of John Carroll University, University Heights, Ohio

Venezuela
St. Ignatius of Loyola College, Caracas

Zimbabwe
St. Ignatius College (Zimbabwe), Chishawasha, Mashonaland

See also
Saint Ignatius University Centre, Antwerp, Belgium
St. Ignatius High School (disambiguation)
St. Ignatius Catholic School (disambiguation)
Saint Ignatius of Loyola
Saint Ignatius of Antioch
Saint Ignatius of Constantinople
St. Ignatius (disambiguation)
Loyola (disambiguation)
Ignatius Gymnasium, Catholic high school in Amsterdam, North Holland, Netherlands